Karli Johansen (born 26 March 1992) is a women's field hockey player from Canada.

Johansen made her senior international debut in 2013, and has been a member of the Canadian women's national team since. She has represented her country at three Commonwealth Games, in Glasgow 2014 and Gold Coast 2018 and Birmingham 2022.

Johansen was an instrumental member of the Canadian junior team, helping the team to silver at the 2012 Junior Pan American Cup, in Guadalajara, Mexico. The team then qualified for the 2013 Junior World Cup in Mönchengladbach, Germany, where Johansen co-captained the team to a fourteenth place finish.

Following the 2017 Pan American Cup, Johansen was named in the 2017 Pan American Elite Team by the Pan American Hockey Federation.

References

External links
 
 Karli Johansen at Field Hockey Canada
 
 

1992 births
Living people
Canadian female field hockey players
Field hockey players at the 2015 Pan American Games
Pan American Games bronze medalists for Canada
Pan American Games medalists in field hockey
Commonwealth Games competitors for Canada
Field hockey players at the 2018 Commonwealth Games
Field hockey players at the 2014 Commonwealth Games
Pan American Games silver medalists for Canada
Field hockey players at the 2019 Pan American Games
Medalists at the 2015 Pan American Games
Medalists at the 2019 Pan American Games
20th-century Canadian women
21st-century Canadian women